The Magong Old City Wall is an old defensive wall in Magong City, Penghu County, Taiwan.

History
The construction of the wall started in 1887 and completed in 1889 during the Qing Dynasty rule. During the Japanese rule, the south wall, both of the south gates, north and east wall and gates were demolished to make ways for urban development. After the handover of Taiwan from Japan to the Republic of China in October 1945, the military perimeter west of the wall became part of Penghu Defense Command. The smaller west gate was then restored to its original form.

Architecture
The wall spans over a length of 2,762 meters with 570 merlons on top of it. It consists of six gates in total.

See also
 Hengchun Old City Wall

References

1889 establishments in Taiwan
Buildings and structures in Penghu County
City walls in Taiwan
Military installations established in 1889